Hovgaard Island (ostrov Khovgarda) is an island of the Nordenskiöld Archipelago in the Kara Sea, off the coast of Siberia. 

Administratively this island belongs to the Krasnoyarsk Krai Federal subject of Russia and is part of the Great Arctic State Nature Reserve, the largest nature reserve of Russia.

Geography
Hovgaard Island is located in the southwestern area of the archipelago on the northern side of the Matisen Strait.

It is part of the Vilkitsky Islands (острова Вилькицкого) —also known as 'Dzhekman Islands'— subgroup of the Nordenskiöld Archipelago. The closest islands are Dzhekman Island  to the northwest and Ovalnyy Island  to the northeast.

The climate in the archipelago is severe and the sea surrounding the island is covered with fast ice in the winter and often obstructed by pack ice even in the summer.

History

In 1900, the islands of the Nordenskiöld Archipelago were explored by Russian Navy Captain Fyodor Matisen during the Polar Expedition on behalf of the Imperial Russian Academy of Sciences led by geologist Baron Eduard Von Toll aboard ship Zarya. 

This island was named after Andreas Hovgaard, a Polar explorer and officer of the Danish Navy who led an expedition to the Kara Sea on steamship Dijmphna in 1882-83.

Further reading
Albert Hastings Markham. Arctic Exploration, 1895

References

External links
Ostrov Khovgarda: Russia 

Islands of the Nordenskiöld Archipelago
Islands of Krasnoyarsk Krai